Men's freestyle 125 kilograms competition at the 2020 Summer Olympics in Tokyo, Japan, took place on 5–6 August 2021 at the Makuhari Messe in Mihama-ku.

This freestyle wrestling competition consists of a single-elimination tournament, with a repechage used to determine the winner of two bronze medals. The two finalists face off for gold and silver medals. Each wrestler who loses to one of the two finalists moves into the repechage, culminating in a pair of bronze medal matches featuring the semifinal losers each facing the remaining repechage opponent from their half of the bracket.

The medals for the competition were presented by Uğur Erdener, IOC Member; Turkey, and the medalists' bouquets were presented by Stan Dziedzic, UWW Vice-President; United States, Olympian, one Bronze Medal.

Schedule
All times are Japan Standard Time (UTC+09:00)

Results
 Legend
 F — Won by fall

Main bracket

Repechage

Final standing

References

Wrestling at the 2020 Summer Olympics
Men's events at the 2020 Summer Olympics